Broût-Vernet is a commune in the Allier department in central France. It is around 15 km north-west of Vichy and 40 km north of Clermont-Ferrand.

Population

See also
Communes of the Allier department

References

Communes of Allier
Allier communes articles needing translation from French Wikipedia